Sapoot is a 1996 Indian Hindi-language action-thriller film directed by Jagdish A. Sharma, starring Sunil Shetty, Akshay Kumar, Karishma Kapoor and Sonali Bendre. Other cast members include Kader Khan, Prem Chopra, Johnny Lever, Kiran Kumar, Avtar Gill, Mukesh Rishi, Shalini Kapoor Sagar, Jeetu Verma and Mahavir Shah.

Plot
Singhania is a powerful Underworld don, who has two sons. Raj looks after his business, while his younger brother Prem is a playboy. Singhania does not deal in drugs, nor does he allow any of his men to deal in narcotics. As a result, his rivals in the crime world, Dhaneshwar and his brother Tejeshwar, set up and murder Singhania. Now Raj and Prem must take back their father's criminal empire one step at a time.

Cast
Suniel Shetty as Raj Singhania
Akshay Kumar as Inspector Prem Singhania
Karishma Kapoor as Pooja Singhania, Prem's wife.
Sonali Bendre as Kajal Singhania, Raj's wife.
Johnny Lever as Deva
Mukesh Rishi as Tejeshwar, Dhaneshwar's younger brother.
Prem Chopra as Dhaneshwar
Kiran Kumar as Shamsher
Mahavir Shah as Kantilal Dalaal / a.k.a. KLD
Shalini Kapoor Sagar as Anjali Singhania, Raj & Prem's sister.
Salim Khan as Harish, Anjali's collegmate and love interest.
Avtar Gill as Masterji Vidyasagar
Kader Khan as Singhania, Raj, Prem & Anjali's father.
Jeetu Verma as Maanik, Dhaneshwar's younger son.
Sanjeev Dabholkar as Dhaneshwar's elder son.
K. K. Raj as Corrupt Police Inspector Pawar, Tejeshwar's ally.

Soundtrack

Soundtrack was composed by Anu Malik. Music was released by T-Series

References

External links

1996 films
1990s Hindi-language films
Indian crime action films
Films scored by Anu Malik
1990s crime action films
1990s masala films
Indian action drama films
1990s action drama films